This is a list of wars and armed conflicts in and involving Canada in chronological order, from the 11th century to the 21st century.

List

Colonial conflicts (11th century – 1867)
The following were conflicts that occurred in present-day Canada from the 11th century AD to the mid-19th century, prior to Canadian confederation. Belligerents in these conflicts typically involved colonies in Canada (e.g. New France, the Canadas), and/or First Nations groups residing in the region.

Canada (1867–present)

The following table lists conflicts involving Canada since confederation in 1867:

See also
 List of Anglo-French conflicts on Hudson Bay
 List of Canadian military operations
 List of Canadian military victories
 List of Canadian peacekeeping missions
 List of conflicts in Canada
 List of massacres in Canada

Notes

References

 
Canada
Wars
Wars